Haydn Thomas (born 17 September 1982), educated at Sir John Colfox School in Bridport Dorset, is a rugby union player for Exeter in the Aviva Premiership. He has previously played for Bristol and Gloucester.

Haydn Thomas' position of choice is as a scrum-half. Thomas has twice been called up to the England side for an end of season uncapped international match against the Barbarians. He was first called up in May 2012, but he was not used in the match. Thomas was called up again a year later on 15 May 2013.

References

External links
Aviva Premiership Player profile
Exeter profile
All Rugby profile

1982 births
Living people
Bristol Bears players
English rugby union players
Rugby union scrum-halves
People from Marston Green
People educated at King's School, Bruton
Exeter Chiefs players
Rugby union players from Solihull